Noel Lane (born 1943) is an Irish former hurler who played as a right corner-back at senior level for the Tipperary county team.

Lane made his first appearance for the team during the 1964 championship but did not become a semi-regular player until the end of the decade. During that time he won one All-Ireland winner's medal as a non-playing substitute and one Munster winner's medal.

At club level, Lane had a successful career with Lorrha–Dorrha. He also lined out with Munster in the inter-provincial championship.

References

1943 births
Living people
Hurling backs
Lorrha-Dorrha hurlers
Munster inter-provincial hurlers
Tipperary inter-county hurlers